Andrey Viktorovich Abramov (born July 3, 1984 in Cheboksary, Chuvashia) is an athlete from Russia, who competes in archery.

2008 Summer Olympics
At the 2008 Summer Olympics in Beijing Abramov finished his ranking round with a total of 660 points, which gave him the 25th seed for the final competition bracket in which he faced Butch Johnson in the first round. Both archers came to a score of 109 points in the regular match. In the extra round that was needed to create a decision Abramov scored 25 points, but Johnson came to 26 points and went through to the next round.

Together with Bair Badënov and Balzhinima Tsyrempilov he also took part in the team event. With his 660 score from the ranking round combined with the 658 of Badënov and the 671 of Tsyrempilov Russia was in fourth position after the ranking round, which gave them a straight seed into the quarter finals. However, with 217-209 they were beaten by the team from China that eventually won the bronze medal.

References
sports-reference

1984 births
Living people
Russian male archers
Archers at the 2008 Summer Olympics
Olympic archers of Russia